The units in which metal type is sold, containing relative proportions of letters appropriate for a given language.

References 

Typography